Trent Limited (portmanteau of Tata Retail Enterprise) is an Indian retail company, which is part of Tata Group and based out of Mumbai. Started in 1998, Trent operates Westside, a retail fashion chain, and Landmark, a bookstore chain with brick and mortar stores in various locations of India.

History
All shareholders of Lakmé were given different shares in Trent. Simone Tata, the chairperson of Lakmé, went on to head Trent. The reason behind the sale was that Tata saw a greater growth potential in retail, and believed that it would be much more difficult for an Indian company to release new cosmetic products in a market that had opened up to global companies.

In August 2005, Trent acquired a 76% controlling stake in Landmark, a Chennai-based privately owned books and music retailer, and completed 100% acquisition in April 2008.

Business
 Westside - It offers branded fashion apparel, footwear and accessories for men, women and children, along with home furnishings and decor. It has over 200 retail stores measuring 8,000-34,000 sq. ft. in 82 major Indian cities under the Westside brand.
 Utsa - It is a modern Indian lifestyle destination which offers ethnic apparel,beauty products and accessories. It is present in 7 stores across 5 cities.
 Zudio - It offers affordable fashion for men, women and children. The company has established 290 stores across 70 cities.
 Star - It offers an assortment of products, including staples, beverages, health and beauty products along with offerings in 10 hypermarkets and 26 supermarkets available in eight Indian cities.
 Landmark - It offers curated range of toys, front listed books, stationery and sports merchandise in its 16 stores.
 Booker Wholesale - It operates cash and carry stores which service kirana stores, traders, wholesalers, hotels, restaurants and small businesses.

References 

Retail companies of India
Companies based in Mumbai
Clothing brands of India
Retail companies established in 1998
Trent Limited
Indian companies established in 1998
1998 establishments in Maharashtra